Charles Clinton was a colonel.

Charles Clinton may also refer to:

Charles John Fynes Clinton (1799–1872), English clergyman and classical scholar
Lord Charles Clinton (1813–1894), British Conservative politician
Charles W. Clinton (1838–1910), American architect

See also